Gabriel Richard Catholic High School, usually referred to as Gabriel Richard or simply GR, is a Catholic, coed high school in Riverview, Michigan, United States, south of Detroit. Named after Father Gabriel Richard, the school was established in 1965, with the first class graduating in 1969. It currently has approximately 300 students and approximately 25 full-time teachers, giving a student-to-teacher ratio of approximately 12:1.  Located in the Roman Catholic Archdiocese of Detroit, Gabriel Richard Catholic High School has also been fully accredited by the North Central Association of Colleges and Schools since the 1993–94 school year.

History
Unlike many other Catholic schools (for example Cabrini High School in nearby Allen Park, Michigan) Gabriel Richard is not tied to a specific parish. In the early 1960s, a group of parish priests from the Downriver area decided that a new Catholic high school needed to be built. The school was to be built in Wyandotte but no suitable site could be found and the school was built at its current location in Riverview. The building was completed in 1965 and the school began accepting students for the 9th grade.

Coed status
The school was designed to be a coed school. However, the original architectural plans called for the separation of the male and female students. The males would use one wing of the building (the east) and the females would use the other (the west). The cafeteria, gymnasium, band room, library, and chapel were to be shared, but used at different times by the boys and girls. However, due to scheduling problems, the school was never operated in the way it was originally planned. Evidence of the original design can still be seen in the layout of the building though. The men's restrooms are all in the east wing, while the women's restrooms are all in the west.

Notable alumni
Brooke Elliott – Television/film/stage actress and singer
Rep. Darrin Camilleri – American politician, currently serving in the Michigan House of Representatives

Extracurricular activities

Clubs and groups
The following is a partial list of student clubs at Gabriel Richard:
Art Club
Band
Drama/Theater Group
National Honor Society
Student Ambassadors
Student Government
Yearbook

Sports

References

External links

Catholic secondary schools in Michigan
Roman Catholic Archdiocese of Detroit
Educational institutions established in 1965
Schools in Wayne County, Michigan
1965 establishments in Michigan